Broc is a municipality in the canton of Fribourg in Switzerland.

Broc may also refer to:

 Broc, Maine-et-Loire, a former commune in France
 Jean Broc (1771–1850), French neoclassical painter
 Broc Glover (born 1960), American former motocross racer
 Broc Little (born 1988), American ice hockey player
 Broc McCauley (born 1986), former Australian rules footballer
 Broc Parkes (born 1981), Australian motorcycle racer

See also
Le Broc (disambiguation)
Ranulf de Broc (died c. 1179), Anglo-Norman nobleman
Brock (disambiguation)
Brok (disambiguation)